Ilian Aleksandrov (born 1 January 1972) is a Bulgarian gymnast. He competed in eight events at the 1992 Summer Olympics.

References

1972 births
Living people
Bulgarian male artistic gymnasts
Olympic gymnasts of Bulgaria
Gymnasts at the 1992 Summer Olympics
Sportspeople from Pernik